Butler County School District  is a school district in Butler County, Alabama, United States.  The school district  oversees a total of six schools.  The schools are Georgiana School, Greenville Elementary, Greenville Middle, Greenville High, McKenzie, and W. O. Parmer Elementary.

External links
 

Education in Butler County, Alabama
School districts in Alabama